Shining Violence is the second full-length album by The Low Lows. It was released on March 3, 2008 via the label, Monotreme.

Track listing
"Sparrows" - 4:11 - Preview Song at Monotreme Records (Link)
"Raining In Eva" - 4:40
"Modern Romance" - 4:00
"Elizabeth Pier" - 3:01
"Tigers" - 4:18
"Disappear" - 3:49
"Five Ways I Didn't Die" - 5:57
"It May Be Low" - 5:15
"Honey" - 5:37

References

External links 
 [ Allmusic]
 Monotreme Records

2008 albums
The Low Lows (band) albums